Ugarov is a Russian masculine surname, its feminine counterpart is Ugarova. It may refer to
Aleksandr Ugarov (born 1982), Russian football player
Alexei Ugarov (born 1985), Belarusian football player
Boris Ugarov (1922–1991), Russian realist painter 
Denis Ugarov (born 1975), Russian football coach and a former player

Russian-language surnames